15th New York Film Critics Circle Awards
February 5, 1950(announced December 27, 1949)

All the King's Men
The 15th New York Film Critics Circle Awards, honored the best filmmaking of 1949.

Winners
Best Film:
All the King's Men
Best Actor:
Broderick Crawford - All the King's Men
Best Actress:
Olivia de Havilland - The Heiress
Best Director:
Carol Reed - The Fallen Idol
Best Foreign Language Film:
Bicycle Thieves (Ladri di biciclette) • Italy

References

External links
1949 Awards

1949
New York Film Critics Circle Awards, 1949
1949 in American cinema
1949 in New York City